The Renegade Ranger is a 1938 American Western film directed by David Howard.

It was the first film Tim Holt made for RKO, for whom he would be one of the studio's biggest stars.

Plot
Captain Jack Steele of the Texas Rangers is sent to arrest the beautiful Judith Alvarez. She claims she is innocent.

Cast 
George O'Brien as Captain Jack Steele
Rita Hayworth as Judith Alvarez
Tim Holt as Larry Corwin
Ray Whitley as Happy
Lucio Villegas as Don Juan Campielo
William Royle as Ben Sanderson
Cecilia Callejo as Toñia Campielo
Neal Hart as Sheriff Joe Rawlings
Monte Montague as Henchman Monte
Bob Kortman as Henchman Idaho
Charles Stevens as Manuel
Jim Mason as Hank
Tom London as Henchman Red

Production 
RKO borrowed Rita Hayworth from Columbia Pictures for this production.
Scenes for the production were shot in Chatsworth, CA.

Soundtrack 
 "Señorita" (Music and lyrics by Albert Hay Malotte)
 Cecilia Callejo – "Cielito Lindo" (Traditional Mexican Ballad)
 Ray Whitley, Ken Card and The Phelps Brothers – "Move Slow, Little Dogie" (Music and lyrics by Willie Phelps)

References

External links 

1938 films
1930s English-language films
1930s Spanish-language films
American black-and-white films
1938 Western (genre) films
American Western (genre) films
RKO Pictures films
Films produced by Bert Gilroy
Films directed by David Howard
1930s American films